Englewood Health is an acute care 289-bed teaching hospital in Englewood, New Jersey. In 2021 it was given a grade A by the Leapfrog patient safety organization.

History
It was incorporated in 1888 as a "non-profit, non-sectarian voluntary health care facility devoted to the care, maintenance and cure of the sick, the injured and the infirm." It opened on June 14, 1890, with 12 beds on a  tract of land on Engle Street.

In 2006, much of the nursing staff went on strike after the union and hospital were unable to reach an agreement over a reduction in benefits and pensions. Temporary nurses were brought in.

While in high school, baseball pitcher Rob Kaminsky raised over $30,000 through his Strikeout Challenge charity for the pediatric cancer ward at Englewood Hospital, as he asked supporters to donate whatever amount they chose for each strikeout he recorded in his senior year in 2013.

On October 15, 2019 HMH announced a merger with Englewood Health, a healthcare provider in Bergen County. HMH agreed to invest $400 million into the facility. The merger is currently pending approval from the Federal Trade Commission and New Jersey state officials. The investment included new operating rooms, additional outpatient care facilities and larger cardiac catheterization labs. The affiliation also included an expanded academic partnership with the Hackensack Meridian School of Medicine. The merger enabled Englewood to become a tertiary academic medical center. The merger is set to be complete within a year. In December 2020, it was announced that the Federal Trade Commission would be suing HMH to block the merger due to monopolistic practices.

Transit hub
In 2013, the center was identified as the location of the terminus of Northern Branch Corridor Project, a proposal to extend the Hudson Bergen Light Rail into eastern Bergen County. (Englewood Route 4 and Englewood Town Center would be stops in the city.) It has also been identified as a terminal of the proposed Bergen BRT system.

References

External links 
 
"Heroes of Medicine: Bloodless Surgery", Time magazine article on Dr. Aryeh Shander 
at CastleConnolly.com, listed among their top doctors
 Bloodless medicine for US military

Hospital buildings completed in 1888
Englewood, New Jersey
Hospitals in New Jersey
Hospitals established in 1888
Hospitals in Bergen County, New Jersey
1888 establishments in New Jersey
Icahn School of Medicine at Mount Sinai
Proposed NJ Transit rail stations